The Championship Wrestling USA Television Championship was a professional wrestling championship defended in Championship Wrestling USA (the former Pacific Northwest Wrestling promotion), owned by Sandy Barr. It was CWUSA's longest running title, lasting from 1992 through 1997.

Title history
Key

See also
Pacific Northwest Wrestling
National Wrestling Alliance

Footnotes

References

Pacific Northwest Wrestling championships
Television wrestling championships
National Wrestling Alliance championships
Regional professional wrestling championships